The following is a list of mayors of the city of Saint-Louis, Senegal. Senegal was under French colonial rule until April 1960.

 Charles Thevenot, circa 1764-1778
 Charles Pierre Cornier, circa 1778-1800
 Flammand, circa 1801-1808
 Charles Porquet, circa 1809-1815
 Pierre Dubois, circa 1816-1822
 Francois Michel Pellegrin, circa 1823-1828
 Jean-Jacques Alin, circa 1829-1847
 , circa 1847-1851
 Nicolas d’Erneville, 1851-1856
 Marcelin Herice, 1856
 Blaise Dumont, 1856-1872 
 Auguste Bréchet, 1872-1875
 Gaspard Devès, 1875-1880
 Auguste de Bourmeister, 1882-1889
 Jean-Jacques Crespin, 1890-1891, 1894-1895
 , 1891-1894
 Louis Descemet, 1895-1909
 Justin Devès, 1909-1910, 1912-1916
 Amadou Dugay Clédor, 1919-1925
 ?
 Babacar Seye, 1952-1960
 Macodou Ndiaye, 1960-1963
 Masseck Ndiaye, 1963-1990
 Abdoulaye Chimère Diaw, 1990-2002
 Oumane Masseck Ndiaye, 2002-2009
 Cheikh Bamba Dièye, 2009-2014
 Mansour Faye, circa 2014

See also
 Timeline of Saint-Louis, Senegal
 Quatre Communes
 List of mayors of Dakar

References

This article incorporates information from the French Wikipedia.

Bibliography
  
 

 
saint louis
saint louis